John A. Costelloe (November 8, 1961 – December 16, 2008) was an American actor best known for his role as Jim "Johnny Cakes" Witowski, the lover of Vito Spatafore, in the HBO television series The Sopranos.

Costelloe, a former FDNY firefighter, died of a self-inflicted gunshot wound on December 16, 2008, at the age of 47. His body was found two days later at his home in Sunset Park, Brooklyn.

Shortly before his death, Costelloe had been playing a hustler in the hit ensemble play Gang of Seven.

Filmography

References

External links

1961 births
2008 deaths
American male film actors
American male television actors
American male stage actors
People from Sunset Park, Brooklyn
Suicides by firearm in New York City
Burials at Green-Wood Cemetery
20th-century American male actors
2008 suicides